Apomecyna varia is a species of beetle in the family Cerambycidae, described by Blanchard in 1851.

References

Apomecynini
Beetles described in 1851